The List of shipwrecks in 1787 includes some ships sunk, wrecked or otherwise lost during 1787.

January

13 January

Unknown date

February

9 February

11 February

12 February

15 February

Unknown date

March

4 March

6 March

9 March

Unknown date

April

20 April

21 April

28 April

Unknown date

May

17 May

20 May

24 May

Unknown date

June

1 June

2 June

6 June

Unknown date

July

6 July

Unknown date

August

2 August

16 August

23 August

24 August

30 August

31 August

Unknown date

September

2 September

11 September

12 September

16 September

19 September

21 September

Unknown date

October

3 October

4 October

18 October

Unknown date

November

2 November

6 November

8 November

14 November

18 November

Unknown date

December

2 December

8 December

9 December

11 December

16 December

17 December

19 December

22 December

24 December

28 December

Unknown date

Unknown date

References

1787